Bartlet et Ultimus "The Caboose" Sims (May 9, 1878 – January 6, 1934) was an All-Southern college football end for the Sewanee Tigers of Sewanee: The University of the South, a member of its 1899 "Iron Men". He also kicked the extra points; his 11 extra points against Cumberland is still a school record.  A documentary film about the 1899 Team and Sims' role was released in 2022 called Unrivaled:  Sewanee 1899.

Early years
Bartlet et Ultimus Sims was born on May 9, 1878 in Bryan, Texas. It was said his parents named him "et Ultimus" as their last child.

References

1878 births
1934 deaths
Sewanee Tigers football players
All-Southern college football players
American football ends
American football placekickers
Players of American football from Texas
People from Bryan, Texas
19th-century players of American football